The 80th season of the Campeonato Catarinense began on January 23, 2005, and ended on April 17, 2005.

Format

Série A1

First stage
Teams are divided into two groups of six teams.
Double round-robin, in which all teams from one group play home-and-away games against all teams within the group.

Second stage
Top 4 teams from each group of first stage are divided into two groups of four teams.
Double round-robin, in which all teams from one group play home-and-away games against all teams within the group.

Third stage
Home-and-away playoffs with the top 2 teams of each group.

The winner of the third stage is crowned the champion. The champion qualify to Campeonato Brasileiro Série C 2005 and qualify to Copa do Brasil 2006

The teams that do not participate in Brazilian Série A and Brazilian Série B will participate in Série A2.

First stage

Group A

Group B

Second stage

Group C

Group D

Third stage

Semi-finals

*The first games were played in Team 1 Stadium
Italic: Teams qualify to Final

Final

* The Game 2 was played in Ibirama, because the Clube Atlético Hermann Aichinger (Atlético de Ibirama) had better Punctuation in the two stages (Stage 1 points + Stage 2 points).

Final standings

* Atlético de Ibirama qualify to Série C, because Criciúma already was qualify to Serie B.

Other Divisions

Série A2: 12 Teams

Champion: Joinville
Runner-up: Marcílio Dias - Qualify to Campeonato Brasileiro Série C 2005*

* Marcílio Dias qualify to Série C, because Joinville already  was qualify to Serie C 

Série B1: 10 teams

Champion: Próspera - Qualify to Divisão Especial 2006*
Runner-up: Figueirense B - The team was disactivate
Third Place: Cidade Azul - Qualify to Divisão Especial 2006*

*The Serie A2 transformed in 2006 in Divisão Especial and Série B1 in Divisão de Accesso

Champion

Campeonato Catarinense seasons
Cat